Carver Beauregard Shannon (born April 28, 1938) was an American and Canadian football player who played for the Winnipeg Blue Bombers and Hamilton Tiger-Cats. He won the Grey Cup with Winnipeg in 1959 and 1961. He played college football in Carbondale, Illinois with Southern Illinois University where he was nominated for the 1958 All-American team. Shannon was also drafted into the National Football League in the 1959 NFL draft by the Los Angeles Rams (Round 19, #224 overall). He played for the Rams from 1962 to 1964, following his career in Canadian football. After his time with the Rams he went to play for the Chicago Bears where he sustained a knee injury and retired from professional football. From 1983 through 1985 Shannon was a line judge in the NFL, wearing uniform number 56. He is a member of the Southern Illinois University Sport Hall of Fame, inducted in 1978. He later worked in the aerospace industry following his sports career and  lives in Los Angeles.

References

1938 births
People from Corinth, Mississippi
Players of American football from Mississippi
Hamilton Tiger-Cats players
Winnipeg Blue Bombers players
Los Angeles Rams players
National Football League officials
Living people